Mitochondrial amidoxime-reducing component 1 (also known as MOCO sulphurase C-terminal domain containing 1, MOSC1 or MARC1) is a mammalian molybdenum-containing enzyme. It is located in the outer mitochondrial membrane and consists of a N-terminal mitochondrial signal domain facing the inter-membrane space, a transmembrane domain, and a C-terminal catalytic domain facing the cytosol. In humans it is encoded by the MOSC1 gene.

MOCO stands for molybdenum cofactor.

MOSC1 has been reported to reduce amidoximes to amidines.

Genetic variation in MARC1 has been reported to be associated with lower blood cholesterol levels, blood liver enzyme levels, reduced liver fat and protection from cirrhosis suggesting that MARC1 deficiency may protect against liver disease.

See also 
 MOCOS

References 

Proteins